"Born To Live, Born To Die" was the last charting single for The Foundations. It made it to number 46 on the UK Singles Chart in September 1969. It was written by Foundations trombone player Eric Allandale and The Foundations. The B-side was composed by the group's organist Tony Gomez.

In the Netherlands it went to number 28 for one week.

Editions
 The Foundations - "Born to Live, Born to Die" / "Why Did You Cry" - PYE 7N 17809 1969 - (UK)
 The Foundations - "Born to Live, Born to Die" / "Why Did You Cry" - UNI 55162 1969 - (US)

References

1969 singles
Pye Records singles
The Foundations songs
Songs written by Eric Allandale
1969 songs